Major-General Sir George Cathcart  (12 May 1794 – 5 November 1854) was a British general and diplomat.

Military career
He was born in Renfrewshire, son of William Cathcart, 1st Earl Cathcart. After receiving his education at Eton and in Edinburgh, he was commissioned into the Life Guards in 1810. In 1813 he went to Russia to serve as aide-de-camp to his father, who was ambassador and military commissioner. George Cathcart was present at the battles between the Russian and the French army in 1813 and he followed the Russian army through Europe, entering Paris in March 1814. 

When Napoleon returned in 1815, Cathcart served as aide-de-camp to the Duke of Wellington and was present at the battles of Quatre Bras and Waterloo. After the war he was commissioned in the 7th Hussars, promoted to lieutenant-colonel in 1826. He then joined the 57th Regiment in 1828, the 8th Hussars in 1830 and the 1st Dragoon Guards in 1838. Cathcart was promoted to colonel in 1841.

In 1852 to 1853, as Governor of the Cape of Good Hope, he granted the first constitution to the colony, ending the 8th Cape Frontier War and defeating the Basutos at the Battle of Berea.

In 1853 he was appointed Adjutant-General to the Forces.

At the start of the Crimean War, he was appointed to command the 4th infantry division. The British government gave him a "dormant commission" which meant that if something were to happen to Lord Raglan, Cathcart would take command. At the Battle of the Alma in September 1854, his division saw no action and after the Battle of Balaclava, where his division was called into action, his dormant commission was revoked. He advised an infantry assault on Sevastopol, thinking it could be taken, but was turned down by Lord Raglan.

He took command of the 1st Brigade during the Battle of Inkerman, where there was great confusion, was told to "Support the Guards", and then led his men too far, and was shot through the heart while charging up a hill with a company of 50 men from the 20th Regiment of Foot on 5 November 1854.

References

Bibliography
 George Cathcart, Commentaries on the War in Russia and Germany in 1812 and 1813, London: 1850.

|-
 

1794 births
1854 deaths
British Army major generals
Governors of the Cape Colony
People educated at Eton College
British Army personnel of the Crimean War
British military personnel killed in the Crimean War
People from Renfrewshire
British Army personnel of the Napoleonic Wars
Younger sons of earls
Knights Grand Cross of the Order of the Bath
British Life Guards officers